Joondalup is a suburb of Perth, Western Australia. Joondalup may also refer to:
 City of Joondalup, a local government area in Western Australia centred on the suburb of Joondalup
 Joondalup railway line, a suburban railway between Perth and Butler, named for the original terminus
 Joondalup railway station, a suburban railway station on the Joondalup line
 ECU Joondalup SC, a soccer club, competing in the National Premier Leagues Western Australia, formerly known as Joondalup City
 Joondalup City FC, a soccer club, competing in Football West State League Division 2
 Joondalup United FC, a soccer club, competing in Football West State League Division 1